The Upper Paris Bridge is an historic structure located near the town of Coggon in rural Linn County, Iowa, United States. The pin-connected Whipple through truss bridge was built in 1879 as a wagon bridge. It was designed by the Wrought Iron Bridge Company of Canton, Ohio. The bridge was listed on the National Register of Historic Places in 1998 as a part of the Highway Bridges of Iowa MPS.

The bridge spans the Wapsipinicon River in the unincorporated community of Paris, Iowa. It cost $4,964.72, to build, of which $3,000 was for the superstructure. Its superstructure is an 11-panel, pin-connected Whipple through truss.

The bridge is significant as a "rare example of a double-intersection Pratt truss," which is a kind of Whipple truss. Its diagonals extend over two panels, and are made of wrought iron, suited for their being under tension. The Whipple truss design was developed by engineer Squire Whipple in 1847.

As of 1994, it was the longest of only eight pin-connected Whipple through truss bridges surviving in Iowa. It then carried "intermittent" traffic in a setting largely unchanged since 1879.

See also
List of bridges documented by the Historic American Engineering Record in Iowa

References

External links

Bridges completed in 1879
Historic American Engineering Record in Iowa
National Register of Historic Places in Linn County, Iowa
Road bridges on the National Register of Historic Places in Iowa
Truss bridges in Iowa
Bridges in Linn County, Iowa
Wrought iron bridges in the United States
Pratt truss bridges in the United States